Bueng Chawak or full name Bueng Chawak Chaloem Phra Kiat is a natural freshwater lake in central Thailand. It has an area of 2,700 rais (1,067 acres), covering the area of the sub-districts Pak Nam, Doem Bang and Hua Khao of Doem Bang Nang Buat District, Suphan Buri Province all the way to the sub-district of Ban Chian, Hankha District, Chai Nat Province.

History
The lake was declared a non-hunting area in 1983. In 1996, on the occasion of the 50-year reign of King Rama IX, the government developed this area as a tourist attraction in honour of His Majesty the King. A public aquarium as well as a zoo and bird park have been created.

Later in 1998, the government registered Bueng Chawak as an important wetland under the Ramsar Convention.

The surrounding lake is beautiful and shady. A large flock of migrating lesser whistling ducks and other waterfowls flies in during the cool season from November to March, and departs again in April. On the shores of the lake, bungalow-style accommodations are available to tourists.

Sights
Bueng Chawak Chaloem Phrakiet Aquarium: consists of two parts: a section showing freshwater fish species and a section showing marine fish species. The highlight is the longest and largest shark tunnel in Southeast Asia.
Bueng Chawak Zoo: exhibit tigers, lions, white tigers, leopards, clouded leopards, camels, axis deers, dwarf cows, bears, cute rabbits and cavies, peafowls and pheasants.
Crocodile Pond: a part of the aquarium. It is a breeding ground for two Thai native crocodiles, the Siamese crocodile and the estuarine crocodile. There are products made from crocodile for sale as souvenir, such as leather bags, leather belts as well as local OTOP handicrafts.
Bueng Chawak Folk Vegetable Park for Subsistence: a botanical garden on an area of 26 rais (10 acres), on an island in the middle of the lake. There are learning point for shade plants, folk vegetables and herbs to treat symptoms. It is also a collection of more than 500 types of folk vegetables such as snake gourds.

In addition, the entrance to the lake, there are also stalls selling dried freshwater fish of the villagers. Most of them are fish species from the central river basin such as Tha Chin and Chao Phraya, many of which are rare in Bangkok such as freshwater sole, river tonguefish, bagrid catfish, etc.

See more
List of protected areas of Thailand
List of Ramsar wetlands of Thailand

References

External links
 
Lakes of Thailand
Geography of Suphan Buri province
Geography of Chai Nat province
Tourist attractions in Chai Nat province
Tourist attractions in Suphan Buri province
Non-hunting areas of Thailand
Aquaria in Thailand
Zoos in Thailand
Botanical gardens in Thailand